Bohumila Bloudilová (March 19, 1876 – August 11, 1946) was a Czech portrait photographer and cousin of Josef Sudek.

Her father Jan married Anna Sudkova on February 15, 1873. From 1894, she worked in the František Krátký photography studio in Cologne, where she also studied. Since 1906, aged 30, she operated her own studio in Kolín.

The studio had an area of about sixty square meters, a contemporary period studio furnished for daylight photography, with a glass wall facing north. The studio ceased to operate on July 1, 1932.

References

Czech photographers
1876 births
1946 deaths
Czech women photographers
Austro-Hungarian photographers
Austro-Hungarian expatriates in Germany